The Shannons Supercar Showdown was an Australian reality television show based around the International V8 Supercars Championship, with drivers competing for a test driver role with Ford Performance Racing.  Aired on 7mate in Australia, seasons two and three of the series have appeared in syndication in the United States on Vibrant TV Network.

Seasons 1 and 2
The first two seasons saw ten drivers from various disciplines competing against each other in a series of challenges to win a drive in the Bathurst 1000 with V8 Supercar team Kelly Racing. The winning driver would co-drive with the show's host, TV personality and racing driver Grant Denyer. Denyer withdrew from the 2012 Bathurst race with a shoulder injury and he was replaced by the 2011 series winner Cameron Waters.

The inaugural series was won by Formula Ford racer Cameron Waters defeating British Touring Car Championship racer Andrew Jordan in the series finale. The second series saw V8 Utes series racer Jesse Dixon defeating Formula Ford racer Glen Wood and Carrera Cup racer Andre Heimgartner in the finale.

Season 3
The format of the show underwent a major change for the third season. Eight drivers, in two teams of four, competed for a test driver role with Ford Performance Racing in a series of challenges at Calder Park Raceway. The season was presented by Briony Ingerson. The two teams were called Team Davison and Team Winterbottom, named for the mentors of the two teams, Will Davison and Mark Winterbottom.

In the final showdown the two drivers, both from Team Davison faced off. They were Formula 3 drivers Todd Hazelwood and Tim Macrow. Hazelwood was proclaimed the series winner and won a drive in the Dunlop V8 Supercar Series in a Minda Motorsport prepared Holden Commodore V8 Supercar before taking on a test driver role with Ford Performance Racing in season 2014.

Fate of the drivers

Competition winners
 Cameron Waters made his Development Series debut in 2012, contesting a half-campaign before joining Ford Performance Racing as a junior driver. Waters would go on to compete in the second tier for another three seasons, winning the championship in 2015 and moving into the Supercars Championship full-time, where as of the conclusion of the 2020 season he has won two races – one of which was the 2017 Sandown 500.
 Jesse Dixon returned to the V8 Utes category, finishing 3rd overall in 2014 before stepping into the Development Series. He completed five rounds of the 2015 season for Image Racing before running out of funding, making a one-off appearance in Adelaide in 2016 before a lack of sponsorship prevented him from furthering his career.
 Todd Hazelwood continued his relationship with Matt Stone Racing after his debut season with the team in 2014, and remained with them until 2019. Like Waters, Hazelwood also won the Super2 Series, in 2017, and subsequently moved into the Supercars Championship. He moved to Brad Jones Racing in 2020 with whom he scored his first podium.

Other notable drivers
 Chelsea Angelo went on to attempt to qualify for the 2019 W Series, however would fail to progress beyond the evaluation tests and later raced in TCR Australia.
 Daniel Cammish went on to win the British Formula Ford Championship in 2013 and back-to-back Porsche Carrera Cup Great Britain championships in 2015 and 2016. He debuted in the British Touring Car Championship in 2018, finishing 10th overall.
 Nick Cassidy forged a successful career in Japan, winning the Japanese Formula 3 Championship in 2015, the Super GT GT500 class in 2017 and the Super Formula Championship in 2019. He now competes in Formula E.
 Shae Davies has since completed a half-season campaign for Erebus Motorsport in the 2016 International V8 Supercars Championship and participated in GT World Challenge Europe in 2019.
 James Golding went on to become a Garry Rogers Motorsport-affiliate driver, making his full-time debut in the Supercars Championship in 2018 and later moving across to S5000.
 Andre Heimgartner is currently racing in the Supercars Championship for Brad Jones Racing, having debuted in 2015.
 Macauley Jones made his debut in the Supercars Championship in 2019.
 Andrew Jordan went on to win the British Touring Car Championship in 2013 and score a podium in the FIA World Rallycross Championship.
 Jack Le Brocq debuted in the Supercars Championship in 2018, after second and third place finishes in the Super2 championship. He has won a race in the 'main game' with Tickford Racing and now drives for Matt Stone Racing.
 Tim Macrow won the Australian Drivers' Championship in 2013.

Results of the program

Bathurst 1000

Development Series
(key) (Round results only)

References

External links
 Official website

2010s Australian reality television series